A brake shoe is the part of a braking system which carries the brake lining in the drum brakes used on automobiles, or the brake block in train brakes and bicycle brakes. A device that is put on a track to slow down railroad cars is also called brake shoe.

Automobile drum brake
The brake shoe carries the brake lining, which is riveted or glued to the shoe.  When the brake is applied, the shoe moves and presses the lining against the inside of the drum.  The friction between lining and drum provides the braking effort. Energy is dissipated as heat. 

Modern cars have disc brakes all round, or discs at the front and drums at the rear.  An advantage of discs is that they can dissipate heat more quickly than drums so there is less risk of overheating.  

The reasons for retaining drums at the rear, are that a drum is more effective than a disc as a parking brake, and drum brake components are cheaper to maintain.

Railway tread brake
The brake shoe carries the brake block.  The block was originally made of wood, then usage of cast iron (particularly grey iron) appear to be later replaced nowadays by high friction composite material. When the brake is applied, the shoe moves and presses the block against the tread of the wheel.  As well as providing braking effort this also "scrubs" the wheel and keeps it clean. This scrubbing causes wear and tear on the wheel tread and often causes brake squeal. Tread brakes on passenger trains have now largely been superseded by disc brakes.

Some operators of heavy goods trains have begun to use brake shoes (and pads) using various kinds of plastic (like kevlar). One of those is DB Cargo, and cites less wear and especially less noise, which is important when driving in built-up areas.

Bicycle rim brake
This comprises a pair of rectangular open boxes which are mounted on the brake calipers of a bicycle and that hold the brake blocks which rub on the rim of a bicycle wheel to slow the bicycle down or stop it.

Cataloguing 
There are different systems for the cataloguing of brake shoes. The most frequently used system in Europe is the WVA numbering system.

Brake shoe for railroad cars 

A brake shoe can be put on the track to stop a moving car. The wheel rolls up to the tongue and then the brake shoe glides with the car on the track until it stops. They are also called rail skids or rail skates.

See also 
 Brake pad

References

External links 
 

Brakes
Vehicle braking technologies

it:Freno#Numero di ceppi del tamburo